This is a list of cameras and printers designed for use with Fujifilm's Instax series of instant film.

Instax Mini cameras and printers

Fujifilm cameras

Fujifilm hybrid camera / printer

Other cameras

Instax Mini printers

Instax Wide cameras

Instax Square cameras and printers

Instax Square hybrid analog/digital camera / printer

Instax Square analog cameras

Instax Square printer

Instax Pivi printers

See also
List of Zink cameras, printers and paper

References

Fujifilm
Technology-related lists
 
Lists of photography topics